Pennypacker may refer to:

People 
 Carlton R. Pennypacker, astrophysicist
 Galusha Pennypacker (c. 1841–1916), Union general during the American Civil War
 Morton Pennypacker (1872–1956), American author and historian
 Samuel W. Pennypacker (1843–1916), American politician
 Sara Pennypacker (fl. 2006–2019), American author of children’s literature
 Rebecca Lane Pennypacker Price (1837–1919), American nurse during the American Civil War

Places 
 Pennybacker Bridge, Austin, Texas
 Pennypack Creek, southeastern Pennsylvania
 Pennypacker Mills, a colonial revival mansion in Schwenksville, Pennsylvania
 Pennypacker Hall, a dormitory at Harvard University

In fiction 
 H. E. Pennypacker, alias of Cosmo Kramer on Seinfeld
 Mrs. Pennypacker, a puppet character on Today's Special
 The Remarkable Mr. Pennypacker, a 1959 American film

See also
 Pennybacker (disambiguation)